Chase Depot is a passenger train station in Chase, Alaska. The area offers service for the Alaska Railroad's Aurora Winter Train. The station is primarily used for hikers and backpackers traveling through the remote area of Chase. The station opened in 1922.

References

External links

Alaska Railroad stations
Railway stations in the United States opened in 1922
1922 establishments in Alaska